Gomti Nagar Railway terminus (GTNR)  is a railway terminus (currently under redevelopment) in Gomti Nagar in Lucknow City, Uttar Pradesh. Its code is GTNR. It serves Gomti Nagar, Indira Nagar, Chinhat, Kamta etc. area of Lucknow city. The station consists of three platforms.

Gomti Nagar is one of the local stations in Lucknow and lies on Barabanki–Lucknow Suburban Railway.

Redevelopment 
The Gomti Nagar Railway Station is being redeveloped by the National Buildings Construction Corporation (India).

The redeveloped station is planned to be equipped with amenities such as segregation of arrival and departure, basement parking, CCTV surveillance, centrally air-conditioned common spaces, an integrated building management system, treated water for horticulture use, and more.

The redevelopment would be in two phases.

 In the first phase mandatory station development comprising station buildings, air concourse, food courts, renovation of platforms and utilities.
 In the second phase commercial development, including retail, basement parking and external development would be undertaken.

According to the Rail Land Development Authority (RLDA), the station is scheduled to complete it's redevelopment by December 2022.

References

External links

Railway stations in Lucknow
Lucknow NER railway division